Atakan Karazor (born 13 October 1996) is a German professional footballer who plays as a midfielder for VfB Stuttgart.

He began his senior career at Borussia Dortmund II in the Regionalliga West before playing for Holstein Kiel for two seasons in the 2. Bundesliga. In 2019, he joined Stuttgart, where he won promotion to the Bundesliga in his first season.

Career

Early years
Born in Essen, North Rhine-Westphalia, Karazor played as a youth for local Schwarz-Weiß Essen and VfL Bochum. In 2015, he joined Borussia Dortmund, where he made his senior debut with the reserve team in the Regionalliga West, playing 59 games over two seasons and scoring on 4 October 2015 in a 2–0 win at 1. FC Köln II.

Holstein Kiel
In June 2017, Karazor left his native region and signed for Holstein Kiel in the 2. Bundesliga on a three-year deal. He injured his ankle ligaments in pre-season, recovering to make the squad in November, before making his professional debut on 23 January by starting in a 2–2 home draw with 1. FC Union Berlin. He scored his first professional goals in 2018–19, equalising in a draw of the same score against SpVgg Greuther Fürth at the Holstein-Stadion on 17 February, and in a 1–1 draw away to FC Ingolstadt 04 on 14 April.

VfB Stuttgart
In May 2019, it was announced Karazor would move to VfB Stuttgart on a contract until 2023. The transfer fee paid to Kiel was reported as about €1 million or €800,000. He played 23 games in his first season as the team won promotion to the Bundesliga as runners-up, and he scored twice on 21 June 2020 in a 6–0 win at 1. FC Nürnberg.

Karazor made his top-flight debut on 3 October 2020 in a 1–1 draw at home to Bayer 04 Leverkusen, as an 84th-minute substitute for Daniel Didavi. On 24 October the following year, he was sent off for the first time in his career in a game of the same score against Union Berlin at the Mercedes-Benz Arena for two yellow cards in the space of 35 seconds.

On 19 May 2022, Karazor extended his contract with VfB Stuttgart until June 2026. He returned to training and playing after his arrest and bail in Spain over the summer; the decision for the club to play him was endorsed by sporting director Sven Mislintat who cited the presumption of innocence, while fans were divided.

Personal life
Born in Germany, Karazor is of Turkish descent.

On 11 June 2022, VfB Stuttgart confirmed via the club's website that Karazor had been arrested while on holiday in Ibiza. He was remanded in custody while investigations continue; Spanish law permits a maximum of two years' pre-trial detention. On 21 July, he was released after paying €50,000 in bail and permitted to leave Spain, due to Germany's law enforcement cooperation with Spain and his professional career presenting a low risk of absconding to a third country.

Career statistics

References

External links

1996 births
Living people
Footballers from Essen
German footballers
Association football midfielders
Borussia Dortmund II players
Holstein Kiel players
Holstein Kiel II players
VfB Stuttgart players
VfB Stuttgart II players
Regionalliga players
2. Bundesliga players
Bundesliga players
German people of Turkish descent